Egami (written: 江上, 繪上, etc.) is a Japanese surname. Notable people with the surname include:

, Japanese synchronized swimmer
, Japanese karateka

Japanese-language surnames